Battle of Arles may refer to:
 Siege of Arles (425), fought between the Visigoths and a Roman-Hunnic alliance
 Battle of Arles (435), fought between the Visigoths and the Western Roman Empire
 Battle of Arles (471), fought between the Visigoths and the Western Roman Empire